Banadak Sadat (also Romanized as Banādak Sādāt and Banādak-e Sādāt; also known as Banadak, Banādak, Banātk, Būnāft, and Pāgodār-e Bonādak) is a village in Miankuh Rural District, in the Central District of Mehriz County, Yazd Province, Iran. At the 2006 census, its population was 402, in 166 families.

References 

Populated places in Mehriz County